Angus Goodleaf (born March 6, 1987), is a Canadian professional lacrosse goaltender in the National Lacrosse League, currently playing for the Philadelphia Wings and for the Kahnawake Braves of the Major Series Lacrosse. He won back to back silver medals as a member of The Iroquois Nationals during the 2010 World Lacrosse Championship and 2015 World Lacrosse Championship.

Awards
Won 2013 NLL Champions Cup
Won 2014 NLL Champions Cup
Won 2010 Mann Cup
Won 2011 Silver Medal at the World Indoor Lacrosse Championships
Won 2015 Silver Medal at the World Indoor Lacrosse Championships
Won 2015 Presidents Cup with Six Nations Rivermen

References

1987 births
Living people
Canadian lacrosse players
Sportspeople from Quebec
National Lacrosse League major award winners
Rochester Knighthawks players
Buffalo Bandits players
Minnesota Swarm players